Gordan Ciprić (born 30 March 1965) is a Croatian football manager and former player.

Born in Zagreb, Ciprić graduated from the Faculty of Kinesiology.

Playing career 

Ciprić played youth football for Dinamo Zagreb and Hajduk Split. In his senior career, he played for Šibenik, NK Zagreb, HAŠK, UR Namur, Borussia Wuppertal, Metalac Osijek, VfB Bad Rappenau, Inker Zaprešić, FSV Wacker Nordhausen, and Eintracht Sondershausen.

Ciprić also won a prominent minifootball tournament "Kutija Šibica" in 1989, playing together with Zvonimir Boban and Robert Prosinečki for minifootball club Termotehna Šela.

Coaching career 
As a head coach, Ciprić led the Dinamo Zagreb youth team, Hrvatski Dragovoljac, HAŠK, and NK Zagreb. As assistant, he worked at Dinamo Zagreb, Croatia U21, NK Zagreb, Slaven Belupo, Kayserispor, Azerbaijan national team, Bosnia and Herzegovina national team, Denizlispor, and Olimpija Ljubljana.

He was also the personal coach of footballer Robert Prosinečki when he was playing at Portsmouth and Standard Liège. From 2007 to 2012, he served as a scout of the Croatia national football team. He has also worked with many Croatian coaches such as Slaven Bilić, Ivo Šušak, and Nikola Jurčević.

On 15 October 2012, it was confirmed that he would be the assistant manager of Prosinečki at Kayserispor. After leaving Kayserispor, he was appointed on 4 December 2014 as the assistant of Prosinečki at the Azerbaijan national team. On 27 October 2017, Prosinečki left the Azerbaijan national team together with his assistants.

In January 2018, he was appointed as the assistant of Prosinečki at the Bosnia and Herzegovina national team. On 27 November 2019 it was confirmed that Prosinečki and his assistants would leave the national team after mutual agreement with the Football Association of Bosnia and Herzegovina.

In December 2019, he was named the assistant manager of Prosinečki at Turkish Super Lig club Kayserispor. This was his second appointment at the club, as he was previously also the assistant of Prosinečki at Kayserispor from 2012 to 2014. In August 2020, Prosinečki decided not to extend his contract with Kayserispor due to the club's transfer policy for next season, so he and his assistants left the club.

In August 2020, four days after leaving Kayserispor, he was named the assistant manager of Prosinečki at Turkish Super Lig club Denizlispor. On 24 November, he left Denizlispor together with Prosinečki after his resignation.

In March 2022, he was named the assistant of Prosinečki at Slovenian PrvaLiga club Olimpija Ljubljana.

References 

1965 births
Living people
Footballers from Zagreb
Association football midfielders
Yugoslav footballers
Croatian footballers
HNK Šibenik players
NK Zagreb players
Union Royale Namur Fosses-La-Ville players
NK Metalac Osijek players
NK Inter Zaprešić players
FSV Wacker 90 Nordhausen players
Yugoslav expatriate footballers
Expatriate footballers in Belgium
Yugoslav expatriate sportspeople in Belgium
Expatriate footballers in West Germany
Yugoslav expatriate sportspeople in West Germany
Croatian expatriate footballers
Expatriate footballers in Germany
Croatian expatriate sportspeople in Germany
Croatian football managers
HAŠK managers
NK Hrvatski Dragovoljac managers
NK Zagreb managers
GNK Dinamo Zagreb non-playing staff
Denizlispor non-playing staff
Croatian expatriate sportspeople in Turkey
Croatian expatriate sportspeople in Azerbaijan
Croatian expatriate sportspeople in Bosnia and Herzegovina
Croatian expatriate sportspeople in Slovenia